China National Ethnic Song and Dance Ensemble (variously translated as China Central Song and Dance Ensemble of Ethnic Groups or Central Nationalities Song and Dance Ensemble), based in Beijing, is the only national-level performance group representing China's ethnic minorities. It was founded in September 1952 by Premier Zhou Enlai. Today, with over 300 members representing 36 ethnic groups, it has performed in over 70 countries and gives over 100 performances each year. Its president is the ethnomusicologist, performer and First Lady of China, Peng Liyuan.

Members

Leadership group 
- Huang Qaoping: Party secretary and Deputy Head

- Ding Qiang: Deputy Party Secretary and Disciplinary Inspection Commission Secretary

- Han Xinbo: Party Committee member and Deputy Head

- Wang Chenggang: Party Committee member and Deputy Head

- Lu Yunsheng: Party Committee member,  Deputy Head and first class player

Famous members 
Li Cangsang: Bai women composer.

Ding Wei:  National first-class director, one of the most representative dancers in China.

Jiang Dawei: Famous tenor singer,  national first-class actor.

Yang Liping: national first-class dancer, the "national treasure"

Tengri

Departments 
China National Ethnic Song and Dance Ensemble contains fifteen departments to take charge of different affairs

- The office department: general affairs including: Coordination and supervision of the daily work of the party and government; drafting of rules and regulations; confidentiality and emergency response, reception of letters and visits, security, comprehensive management, logistics support, discipline inspection and supervision. It also takes care of work involving unions, youth, women etc.

- The business department: organizing performances, cultural exchanges of national songs and dances, training and assessment. It keeps recording of the performances and supervises other departments

- Creative Research Department: Research, create, collect, and organize national literary and artistic works. It also arranges and designs campaigns and performances, as well as planning short and medium-term creative plans and practicing artistic creation plans

- Vocal team: rehearsal and perform national ethnic songs; introducing outstanding singers

- Dance team: rehearsal and perform national ethnic dances; introducing outstanding dancers

- Music team: rehearsal and perform national ethnic music; introducing outstanding players

- Human Resources Department: staff recruitment, dismissal and assessment; organization establishment, wages and benefits, education and training, personnel files, social security, external affairs management, etc

-Financial department: budget, income and expenditure accounting; financial and treasury final accounting. Also responsible for basic construction and internal audit work

- Asset Management Department: manage nation-owned assets, government procurement and employee housing

- Theater Operation Department: operates The China National Ethnic Song and Dance Ensemble Theater; arrange performances and carry out rehearsals for performances

- Performance Management Department: Arrange commercial performances; promote goods of China National Ethnic Song and Dance Ensemble and elaborate domestic and international market

- Retirement Office Department: Take care of retired staffs

- Training Center: art training work

- Information center: collecting and releasing information;running the official website.

Important repertoires

Dances 
- Reba on the Prairie

- The Spirit of the Bird

- Chasing the Fish

- Spring

- Red Cloud

- Chasing Fish

Songs 
- Chorus "fifty-six fifty-six national flower"

- Guests from afar, please stay

- Mongolians

Instrumental performances 
-Yao Dance

- Spring of the Tianshan Mountains

- Spirit of the Drum

Classic repertoire 
-Harmonic China

-Colorful Homes

The China National Ethnic Song and Dance Ensemble Theater

Location 
South Street No. 21, Haidian District Zhongguancun, Beijing City. Next to the Minzu University of China, the Art Academy of PLA, Peking University Stomatological Hospital and Beijing Foreign Studies University.

Information 
The construction of the central national song and dance troupe National Theater building was completed in December, 2012.  It covers an area of 20 square kilometers, 2 levels of more than 900 seats for the audience.  The theater also contains a 500-square-meter  theater within it, a meeting room, 2 vip rooms,  7 rehearsal rooms and 8 dressing rooms in total. The China National Ethnic Song and Dance Ensemble Theater is equipped with professional audio and lighting systems and is capable of hosting performances with various purposes, including performance, public relations activities, news conference, TV programs, conferences and training activities.

See also
Music of China
List of folk dance performance groups

References

Folk dance companies
Performing groups established in 1952
1952 establishments in China